The Maohi Protestant Church or Māòhi Protestant Church is a Reformed church in French Polynesia.

It is a member of the World Communion of Reformed Churches.

The first missionaries arrived in 1797.  After 1815 the majority of the population identified themselves with Christianity, and formed this national Protestant church which spread from Tahiti to the four archipelagos. The official founding date of the church is 1815.

Following developments in 1863 the London Missionary Society handed its control over the church to the Paris Evangelical Missionary Society.

In 1962 the church become autonomous under the name of Eglise évangélique de Polynésie francaise. Except for the Marquesas Islands and Îles Tuamotu-Gambier, the Maóhi Protestant Church is the leading, predominant church in French Polynesia.  It has parishes and thousands of members in New Caledonia. The church has 130,000 members and 96 congregations and 81 house fellowships. It has districts and a General assembly.

References

Religion in French Polynesia
Tahitian culture
Religion in New Caledonia
Christian organizations established in 1962
Reformed denominations in Oceania
Members of the World Communion of Reformed Churches